Michael Cox (born ) is an Irish independent bishop. He is a well-known member of the Independent Catholic movement in Ireland and is also known for attempting to ordain the singer Sinéad O'Connor. He is the founder and bishop superior of the Irish Orthodox Catholic and Apostolic Church.

Early life

Cox was an Irish soldier and a Dún Laoghaire harbour policeman.

Ministry 
Cox was consecrated as a bishop in 1978 by Ciarán Broadbery, who in turn was consecrated in 1977 by Clemente Domínguez y Gómez of the independent Palmarian Catholic Church.
Domínguez was consecrated in January 1976 by Catholic Archbishop Ngô Đình Thục. In September 1976, Thục, and those he had ordained, were excommunicated from the Catholic Church.

Cox offered Tridentine Masses at Monkstown, County Dublin, in the mid-1980s.

Cox's church is St Coleman's, in the townland of Cree near Birr, County Offaly.

In May 1998, Cox consecrated a Catholic priest, Patrick Buckley, as a bishop. In June 1998, Jim Cantwell, director of the Irish Catholic Press and Information Office, said that Cox's consecration of Buckley was valid but illicit. However, the Catholic Media Office of the Catholic Bishops' Conference of England and Wales later "said that it doubts that the bishop's episcopal consecration is valid".

In April 1999, Cox ordained female rock singer Sinéad O'Connor as a priest. Her ordination ceremony, after six weeks of theological study, was held in a Lourdes hotel bedroom. O'Connor then assumed the religious name of "Mother Bernadette Mary". Though Catholic magisterium holds this ordination as invalid.

In 2001, Cox planned to convert his  commercial fishing trawler, called The Little Bishop, into "a mobile floating church, offering on-board marriages and baptisms to people around the British Isles." Cox planned to protest against the ship being sailed into Ireland by the pro-choice feminist group Women on Waves. In 2004, Cox's  trawler, called The Patriarch, caught fire while underway and sank.

In 2011, Cox was a candidate in the general election for the Laois–Offaly constituency, coming last with 60 votes. In 2013, a District Court judge requested that the Garda Síochána investigate a marriage conducted by Cox for a 17-year-old Traveller youth and his partner. Civil marriages in Ireland require that the participants are over 18, or have a Court Exemption Order if this is not the case. Cox states that such weddings conducted by him are religious, not civil, so there is no religious reason why somebody 16 years old should not get married.

 Cox insists on parental consent and parents being present at the ceremony.

Notes

References

External links 
 Seventh Lineage (Thuc Consecrations) - Outline of Episcopi Vagantes 
  

1940s births
Living people
Bishops of Independent Catholic denominations
Irish bishops
Irish Catholics
People excommunicated by the Catholic Church
People from County Cork
Year of birth uncertain